The Spilsby Sandstone is a geologic formation in England. It preserves fossils dating back to the Cretaceous period.

See also

 List of fossiliferous stratigraphic units in England

References
 

Cretaceous England
Sandstone formations
Lower Cretaceous Series of Europe
Valanginian Stage
Berriasian Stage